Orishas (singular: orisha) are spirits that play a key role in the Yoruba religion of West Africa and several religions of the African diaspora that derive from it, such as Cuban, Dominican and Puerto Rican Santería and Brazilian Candomblé. The preferred spelling varies depending on the language in question: òrìṣà is the spelling in the Yoruba language, orixá in Portuguese, and orisha, oricha, orichá or orixá in Spanish-speaking countries.

According to the teachings of these religions, the orishas are spirits sent by the supreme creator, Olodumare, to assist humanity and to teach them to be successful on Ayé (Earth). Rooted in the native religion of the Yoruba people, most orishas are said to have previously existed in òrún - the spirit world - and then became  Irúnmọlẹ̀ - spirits or divine beings incarnated as human on Earth. Irunmole took upon a human identity and lived as ordinary humans in the physical world, but because they had their origin in the divine, they had great wisdom and power at the moment of their creation.

Some believers and practitioners of the Ifá religion, where the pantheon system of orishas originates, believe that  orishas are a different class of divine beings who became deified, divinized or  transformed after their departure from their human state on Earth.  These practitioners believe the orishas to have been ordinary humans who were deified upon their death due to the lives they led, their outstanding spiritual growth and extraordinary feats accomplished in their lives while on Earth.

The orishas found their way to most of the New World as a result of the Atlantic slave trade and are now expressed in practices as varied as Santería, Candomblé, Trinidad Orisha, Umbanda, and Oyotunji, among others. The concept of òrìṣà is similar to those of deities in the traditional religions of the Bini people of Edo State in southern Nigeria, the Ewe people of Benin, Ghana, and Togo, and the Fon people of Benin.

Number
Yoruba tradition often says that there are 400 + 1 orishas, which is associated with a sacred number. Other sources suggest that the number is "as many as you can think of, plus one more – an innumerable number". Different oral traditions refer to 400, 700, or 1,440 orishas.

Beliefs

Practitioners traditionally believe that daily life depends on proper alignment and knowledge of one's Orí. Ori literally means the head, but in spiritual matters, it is taken to mean a portion of the soul that determines personal destiny.

Some orishas are rooted in ancestor worship; warriors, kings, and founders of cities were celebrated after death and joined the pantheon of Yoruba deities. The ancestors did not die, but were seen to have "disappeared" and become orishas. Some orishas based on historical figures are confined to worship in their families or towns of origin; others are venerated across wider geographic areas.

Ase

Ase is the life-force that runs through all things, living and inanimate, and is described as the power to make things happen. It is an affirmation that is used in greetings and prayers, as well as a concept of spiritual growth. Orìṣà devotees strive to obtain Ase through iwa-pele, gentle and good character, and in turn they experience alignment with the ori, what others might call inner peace and satisfaction with life. Ase is divine energy that comes from Olodumare, the creator deity, and is manifested through Olorun, who rules the heavens and is associated with the sun. Without the sun, no life could exist, just as life cannot exist without some degree of ashe. Ase is sometimes associated with Eshu, the messenger orisha. For practitioners, ashe represents a link to the eternal presence of the supreme deity, the orishas, and the ancestors.

The concept is regularly referenced in Brazilian capoeira. Axé in this context is used as a greeting or farewell, in songs and as a form of praise. Saying that someone "has axé" in capoeira is complimenting their energy, fighting spirit, and attitude.

Pantheon 
The orisa are grouped as those represented by the color white, who are characterized as tutu "cool, calm, gentle, and temperate"; and those represented by the colors red or black, who are characterized as gbigbona "bold, strong, assertive, and easily annoyed". Like humans, orishas may have a preferred color, food, or object. The traits of the orishas are documented through oral tradition.

Aganju  
Ajaka 
Ayangalu (The patron deity of drummers)
Ara (Ara in the Yoruba language)
Babalu Aye (Obaluaye in the Yoruba language)
Egungun (The patron deity of the sainted dead)
Erinle
Esu (He is the animating principle of existence)
Ibeji (The patron deities of twins)
Iroko (Iroko in the Yoruba language)
Iya Nla
Logunede (Logunede in the Yoruba language)
Moremi
Nana 
Oba  
Obatala
Oduduwa
Ogun (The patron deity of warriors and metalworkers)
Oke 
Oko (The patron deity of farmers)
Olokun (The patron deity of the Sea)
Olumo (The patron deity of Abeokuta)
Oranyan
Orò (patron deity of justice & bullroarers)
Oronsen (The patron deity of Owo). 
Orunmila (The patron deity of the Ifa oracle)
Ori (The personal patron of each individual Yoruba person)
Osanyin (The patron deity of herbalists)
Osoosi (The patron of the forest, the hunter & marksmen) 
Osun (The patron deity of Osogbo)
Oshunmare (Osumare in the Yoruba language, the patron deity of the  Rainbow)
Otin (The patron deity of the Otin river)
Oya (The patron deity of the River Niger)
Sango (The patron deity of Oyo)
Yemoja
Yewa (The patron deity of the Yewa River)

See also
 Alusi, the Igbo pantheon.
 List of Yoruba deities
 Loa
 Nkisi
 Winti
 West African mythology
 Yoruba mythology

References

Further reading 

 E. Bolayi Idowu, Olodumare: God in Yoruba Belief. 
 J. Omosade Awolalu, Yoruba Beliefs & Sacrificial Rites. 
 William Bascom, Sixteen Cowries.
 Lydia Cabrera, El Monte: Igbo-Nfinda, Ewe Orisha/Vititi Nfinda. 
 Raul Canizares, Cuban Santeria.
 Chief Priest Ifayemi Elebuibon, Apetebii: The Wife of Orunmila. 
 Fakayode Fayemi Fatunde (2004) Osun, The Manly Woman. New York: Athelia Henrietta Press.
 James T. Houk, Spirits, Blood, and Drums: The Orisha Religion of Trinidad. 1995. Temple University Press.
 Jo Anna Hunter, "Oro Pataki Aganju: A Cross Cultural Approach Towards the Understanding of the Fundamentos of the Orisa Aganju in Nigeria and Cuba". In Orisa Yoruba God and Spiritual Identity in Africa and the Diaspora, edited by Toyin Falola, Ann Genova. New Jersey: Africa World Press, Inc. 2006.
 Baba Ifa Karade, The Handbook of Yoruba Religious Concepts, Weiser Books, York Beach, New York, 1994. 
 Gary Edwards (Author), John Mason (Author), Black Gods – Orisa Studies in the New World, 1998. 
 John Mason, Olokun: Owner of Rivers and Seas. 
 John Mason, Orin Orisa: Songs for selected Heads. 
 David M. O'Brien, Animal Sacrifice and Religious Freedom: Church of the Lukumi Babalu Aye v. City of Hialeah.
 S. Solagbade Popoola, Ikunle Abiyamo: It is on Bent Knees that I gave Birth. 2007. Asefin Media Publication
 Robert Farris Thompson, Flash of the Spirit.
 Robert D Pelton, The Trickster in West Africa chapters on Eshu and Legba. 1989. University of California Press
 J Lorand Matory, Black Atlantic Religion. 2009. Princeton University Press

External links 

 
Afro-American religion
Afro-Brazilian culture
Afro-Cuban culture
Nigerian culture
Yoruba culture
Yoruba religion
Yoruba words and phrases
Conceptions of God